Piliostigma is a genus of flowering plants in the legume family, Fabaceae. It belongs to the subfamily Cercidoideae and the tribe Bauhinieae. It is dioecious, with male and female flowers on separate plants.

Species
Piliostigma comprises the following species:

 Piliostigma foveolatum (Dalzell) Thoth.
 Piliostigma malabaricum (Roxb.) Benth.—purple orchid tree

 Piliostigma reticulatum (DC.) Hochst.
 Piliostigma thonningii (Schum.) Milne-Redh.
 Piliostigma tortuosum (Collett & Hemsl.) Thoth.

References

External links
 
 

Cercidoideae
Fabaceae genera
Dioecious plants
Taxa named by Christian Ferdinand Friedrich Hochstetter